The 70th Air Refueling Squadron is an Air Force Reserve Command unit, assigned to the 349th Operations Group at Travis Air Force Base, California.  It is an associate of the active duty 9th Air Refueling Squadron, United States Air Force, and operates the McDonnell Douglas KC-10 Extender aircraft conducting mobility, and air refueling missions. The squadron has served in this role since 1994.

The squadron was activated as a Boeing KC-97 Stratofreighter unit in August 1955.  It provided global air refueling for Strategic Air Command (SAC) with the KC-97, and later with the Boeing KC-135 Stratotanker.  After 1970, it also provided airborne command and control support for SAC.  It supported contingency operations and deployed aircraft and aircrews for Desert Storm.  In 1985, the squadron was consolidated with the 470th Bombardment Squadron, a World War II medium bomber training unit.  The squadron was inactivated in 1993, as Grissom Air Force Base, Indiana was transferred to Air Force Reserve Command

History

World War II bomber training

The 470th Bombardment Squadron was activated on 16 July 1942 at Columbia Army Air Base, South Carolina as one of the original components of the 334th Bombardment Group, and was equipped with North American B-25 Mitchells.  The 470th acted as a Replacement Training Unit (RTU) for the B-25. However, the AAF found that standard military units, whose manning was based on relatively inflexible tables of organization were not well adapted to the training mission.  Accordingly, in the Spring of 1944, the 334th Group, its components and supporting units at Greenville, were disbanded on 1 May and replaced by the 330th AAF Base Unit (Medium, Bombardment).  The emblems of the four squadrons of the 334th Bombardment Group, featuring "Bomby-the-Bear" were featured in the National Geographic Magazine in June 1943

Air Refueling operations

Strategic Air Command

The 70th Air Refueling Squadron was activated at Little Rock Air Force Base, Arkansas on 1 August 1955 and assigned to the 70th Strategic Reconnaissance Wing.  At the time the squadron was activated, Little Rock was undergoing major construction and the few elements of the 70th Wing that were crewed operated from Lockbourne Air Force Base, Ohio.  With the completion of construction, the wing returned to Little Rock in October 1955 and the squadron finally became operational.

The squadron provided air refueling support to the Boeing RB-47 Stratojets of its parent wing and other SAC units.  It deployed as a unit to a forward base at Ernest Harmon Air Force Base, Newfoundland in 1956 and 1957, while the entire 70th Wing deployed to Sidi Slimane Air Base, Morocco from October to December 1956.  In February 1958, the 70th Wing began to reduce its reconnaissance missions and in June 1958 began training SAC aircrews in the Stratojet. The 70th Squadron, however continued its deployments with the KC-97, conducting deployments to Lajes Field, Azores through 1962.  In August 1961, the squadron transferred to the 384th Bombardment Wing, which was also stationed at Little Rock, and continued to operate under that wing until the 384th inactivated on 1 September 1964 as B-47 operations at Little Rock came to an end, although it ended KC-97 operations in 1963.  

In response to the Cuban Missile Crisis, on 29 October 1962, SAC directed movement of its KC-97 force to forward locations to support its B-47s that had been placed on first cycle alert in the Eastern United States.  This required deployment of 87 KC-97s, carrying with them all required supporting personnel, to Harmon, Lajes, and Goose Bay Airport, Labrador.  The dispersed aircraft were to be ready to launch within an hour.  The dispersed planes began to return to their home bases on 15 November, and all were home by 24 November.

In 1964, the squadron began to equip with the Boeing KC-135 Stratotanker.  It was attached to the 43d Bombardment Wing, which was equipped with the supersonic Convair B-58 Hustler, on 19 August and assigned to the 43d once the wing moved to Little Rock on 1 September 1964.  In 1969, the 43d Wing began to draw down with the removal of the B-58 from the inventory and the forthcoming transfer of Little Rock to Tactical Air Command as a base for the Lockheed C-130 Hercules.

The phase out of the B-58 resulted in the 305th Bombardment Wing at Grissom Air Force Base, Indiana becoming an air refueling wing, and the 70th moved to Grissom on 1 January 1970 to become the wing's third refueling squadron.  Shortly afterwards, SAC decided to move the Boeing EC-135 aircraft supporting its alternate airborne command posts from their vulnerable locations near the coastlines of the United States and established the 3rd Airborne Command and Control Squadron at Grissom to operate this element of the Post Attack Command and Control System (PACCS).  While the primary airborne command post at Offutt Air Force Base, Nebraska was airborne, these aircraft remained on ground alert.  In 1975, the 3rd was inactivated and its PACCS functions at Grissom were absorbed by the 70th, which maintained them until inactivating in 1993. In 1983, the squadron supported Operation Urgent Fury, providing refueling to the transports, gunships, and fighters operating in Grenada.  In September 1985, the squadron was consolidated with the 470th Bombardment Squadron.

From December 1989 through January 1990, the squadron provided refueling support for Operation Urgent Fury, the United States intervention in Panama. A few months later it deployed aircrews and aircraft to Europe and the Arabian peninsula during the Gulf War.  These deployments lasted into 1991.  After Air Mobility Command assumed responsibility for air refueling operations in 1992, it began to realign its tanker force.  As a result of this realignment, Grissom was transferred to Air Force Reserve Command, and the 70th was inactivated on 1 April 1993.

Reserve associate unit
On 1 September 1994, the squadron was reactivated in the reserve at Travis Air Force Base, California as part of the 349th Air Mobility Wing.  The squadron did not have its own aircraft, but flew the McDonnell Douglas KC-10 Extenders of the active duty 9th Air Refueling Squadron as an reserve associate unit.  After the September 11 attacks, the squadron supported U.S. sorties during the War in Afghanistan (2001-2021) and the homeland defense Operation Noble Eagle. It also deployed to support the 2003 invasion of Iraq and the Iraq War. The squadron also supported the Hurricane Katrina relief effort in September 2005.

Lineage
 470th Bombardment Squadron
 Constituted as the 470th Bombardment Squadron (Medium) on 9 July 1942
 Activated on 16 July 1942
 Disbanded on 1 May 1944
 Reconstituted on 19 September 1985 and consolidated with the 70th Air Refueling Squadron as the 70th Air Refueling Squadron

 70th Air Refueling Squadron
 Constituted as the 70th Air Refueling Squadron, Medium on 3 June 1955
 Activated on 1 August 1955
 Redesignated 70th Air Refueling Squadron, Heavy on 1 November 1963
 Consolidated with the 470th Bombardment Squadron on 19 September 1985
 Redesignated 70th Air Refueling Squadron on 1 September 1991
 Inactivated on 1 April 1993
 Activated in the reserve on 1 September 1994

Assignments
 334th Bombardment Group, 16 July 1942 – 1 May 1944
 70th Strategic Reconnaissance Wing, 1 August 1955
 384th Bombardment Wing, 1 August 1961 (attached to 43d Bombardment Wing after 19 August 1964)
 43d Bombardment Wing, 1 September 1964
 305th Air Refueling Wing, 1 January 1970
 305th Operations Group, 1 September 1991 – 1 April 1993
 349th Operations Group, 1 September 1994 – present

Stations
 Greenville Army Air Base, South Carolina, 16 July 1942 – 1 May 1944
 Little Rock Air Force Base, Arkansas, 1 August 1955 (deployed to Ernest Harmon Air Force Base, Newfoundland 24, June-24 September 1957; Lajes Field (later Lajes Air Base), Azores, Portugal, 3 September 1958 – 12 January 1959, 5 October 1960 - 11 January 1961, 31 July-28 September 1962)
 Grissom Air Force Base, Indiana, 1 January 1970 – 1 April 1993
 Travis Air Force Base, California, 1 September 1994 – present

Aircraft
 North American B-25 Mitchell (1942–1944)
 Boeing KC-97 Stratofreighter (1955–1963)
 Boeing KC-135 Stratotanker (1964–1969, 1970–1993)
 Boeing EC-135 (1976–1993)
 McDonnell Douglas KC-10 Extender (1994 – present)

References

Notes
 Explanatory notes

 Citations

Bibliography

 
 
 
 
 
 
 
 

Military units and formations in California
070
Military units and formations established in 1955
Units and formations of Strategic Air Command